A Hoàng (born 31 July 1995) is a Vietnamese footballer of Giẻ Triêng ethnicity who plays as a defender for V.League 1 club Hoàng Anh Gia Lai.

References 

1995 births
Living people
Vietnamese footballers
Association football defenders
V.League 1 players
Hoang Anh Gia Lai FC players
Vietnam international footballers
People from Kon Tum Province